Dudley House in Ventura, California is a  historic house museum built in 1891 in a Late Victorian-style.  Designed and built by local architect and builder Selwyn Shaw, it was listed on the National Register of Historic Places in 1977.

At the time of the NRHP listing, the farmhouse was occupied by the fifth generation of the Dudley family and the property included nine out of an original .  The property was deemed significant for its architecture and for its association with this farming family;  it was then the last surviving family farm in the city of Ventura.

Owned by the city of Ventura, the house is managed by San Buenaventura Heritage, Inc. which opens the house for tours on a limited basis.

See also
 City of Ventura Historic Landmarks and Districts
National Register of Historic Places listings in Ventura County, California

References

External links
 Dudley House - San Buenaventura Heritage, Inc.
"City Landmarks, Points of Interest, and Historic Districts" "Historic Preservation in Ventura" webpage. City of Ventura. Accessed 16 September 2017
(searchable GIS). City of Ventura. Accessed 29 September 2013
 Detail Sheet #44 accessed from link on City Map with Historic Landmarks

Houses in Ventura County, California
Buildings and structures in Ventura, California
Historic house museums in California
Museums in Ventura County, California
Houses completed in 1891
Houses on the National Register of Historic Places in California
National Register of Historic Places in Ventura, California
Victorian architecture in California